The Bargain may refer to:

 The Bargain (1914 film), a 1914 American Western film
 The Bargain (1921 film), a 1921 British silent crime film
 The Bargain (1931 film), a 1931 all-talking pre-code comedy drama film
"The Bargain", song by Arthur Somervell
Bargain (disambiguation)